Big Ones is a compilation album by American rock band Aerosmith, released on November 1, 1994 by Geffen Records. Big Ones featured 12 hits from the band's three consecutive multi-platinum albums, Permanent Vacation (1987), Pump (1989), and Get a Grip (1993), as well as the hit, "Deuces Are Wild" from The Beavis and Butt-Head Experience (1993), and two new songs, "Blind Man" and "Walk on Water", which were recorded during a break in the band's Get a Grip Tour. These songs were also included on the band's 2001 compilation album, Young Lust: The Aerosmith Anthology. Big Ones is the band's second best-selling compilation album, reaching #6 on the Billboard charts, and selling four million copies in the United States alone. The album quickly became a worldwide hit reaching the Top 10 in nine countries before the end of the year.

History 
In March 1987, Aerosmith began working at Little Mountain Sound Studios in Vancouver, British Columbia, Canada for the album that became Permanent Vacation. The recordings were completed in May, the album was released in August, and reached #11 on the Billboard 200. The album released several singles including "Dude (Looks Like a Lady)" (#4 on the Mainstream Rock Charts, #14 on the Billboard Hot 100), "Rag Doll" (#12 Mainstream Rock Charts, #17 Hot 100), and "Angel" (#2 Mainstream Rock, #3 Hot 100).

Then in April 1989, the band went back to Little Mountain Sound Studios to record songs for their next studio album, Pump. The recordings were completed in June 1989, the album was released in September, and reached #5 on the Billboard 200. Several other singles were released from Pump including "Janie's Got a Gun" (#2 Mainstream Rock, #4 Hot 100), "Love in an Elevator" (#1 Mainstream Rock, #5 Hot 100), "The Other Side" (#1 Mainstream Rock, #22 Hot 100) and "What It Takes" (#1 Mainstream Rock, #9 Hot 100). In May a song was recorded during the sessions for Pump called "Deuces Are Wild", however it was not released on the album and was not released until the 1993 compilation album, The Beavis and Butt-head Experience.

In January 1992, the band began recording at A&M Studios in Los Angeles, California. The recordings at A&M ended in February and in September the band began recording again at Little Mountain Sound Studios. The recordings at Little Mountain ended in November, and Aerosmith's next studio album, Get a Grip was released in April 1993 and went to #1 on the Billboard 200. The singles released from Get a Grip included "Amazing" (#3 Mainstream Rock, #9 Top 40 Mainstream, #24 Hot 100), "Cryin'" (#1 Mainstream Rock, #11 Top 40 Mainstream, #12 Hot 100), "Eat the Rich" (#5 Mainstream Rock), "Livin' on the Edge" (#1 Mainstream Rock, #18 Hot 100, #19 Top 40 Mainstream), and "Crazy" (#7 Mainstream Rock, #7 Top 40 Mainstream, #17 Hot 100).

In April 1994 the band went to The Power Station in New York City, New York and started recording the songs "Walk on Water" and "Blind Man". The group then completed the songs in June at Capri Digital Studios, Capri, Italy. "Blind Man" reached #3 on the Mainstream Rock Charts, #23 on the Top 40 Mainstream, and #48 on the Hot 100 in 1994. "Walk on Water" reached #16 on the Mainstream Rock Charts in 1995.

There were no songs from Aerosmith's first Geffen release, Done With Mirrors (1985), despite the hit "Let the Music Do the Talking" which reached #18 on the Mainstream Rock Charts.

Reception 

For his review of Big Ones for Allmusic, Stephen Thomas Erlewine gave the album a high rating because he felt that the album captured the "comeback" of Aerosmith.  However, he felt that the songs did not match the "rawness" of the band's earlier material, and seemed a little too "mainstream", with rampant over-production and too many power ballads. Robert Christgau did not think the album included enough songs from the album Get a Grip, and did not like that it excluded "My Fist, Your Face." However, he did like the two new tracks, "Walk on Water" and "Blind Man." Tom Sinclair thought well of the album in his review for Entertainment Weekly because it showed that they could mix hard rock and funk-based blues, and that they were more than just the American version of The Rolling Stones.  He'd have given the album a higher rating had it not included the song "Angel".

Track listing 

NB: "Love in an Elevator," "Janie's Got a Gun," and "The Other Side" are presented without their original lead-ins as heard on Pump ("Going Down," "Water Song," and "Dulcimer Stomp," respectively).

Personnel 
Per liner notes

Aerosmith
Steven Tyler – lead vocals, keyboards, harmonica
Tom Hamilton – bass, backing vocals on "Love in an Elevator"
Joey Kramer – drums
Joe Perry – lead and rhythm guitar, backing vocals, pedal steel guitar
Brad Whitford – rhythm and lead guitar, acoustic guitar

Additional musicians
Jim Vallance – organ on "Rag Doll"
Drew Arnott – mellotron on "Angel"
Tom Keenlyside – saxophone, tenor saxophone, clarinet, horn arrangement
Ian Putz – baritone saxophone
Bob Rogers – trombone
Henry Christian – trumpet
Bruce Fairbairn – trumpet, background vocals on "Love in an Elevator"
Bob Dowd – background vocals on "Love in an Elevator"
John Webster – keyboards
Richard Supa – keyboards on "Amazing"
Don Henley – background vocals on "Amazing"
Desmond Child – keyboards on "Crazy"
Paul Baron – trumpet
Mapuhi T. Tekurio – Polynesian log drums on "Eat the Rich"
Melvin Liufau – Polynesian log drums on "Eat the Rich"
Wesey Mamea – Polynesian log drums on "Eat the Rich"
Liainaiala Tagaloa – Polynesian log drums on "Eat the Rich"
Sandy Kanaeholo – Polynesian log drums on "Eat the Rich"
Aladd Alatina Teofilo Jr. – Polynesian log drums on "Eat the Rich"

Production
Bruce Fairbairn – producer
Michael Beinhorn – producer on "Walk on Water" and "Blind Man"
Mike Fraser – engineer, mixing
Bob Rock – engineer on tracks from Permanent VacationKen Lomas – assistant engineer, second engineer
Karl Heilbron - assistant engineer. Deuces are Wild mix. 
Brendan O'Brien – mixing on Get a Grip tracks and "Deuces Are Wild". 
Tim Collins – management
John Kalodner – artists and repertoire
George Marino – mastering
David J. Donnelly – mastering supervision
Gibran Evans – design
FPG International – photography
Steve Gardner – photography
Norman Seeff – photography

 Charts 

 Weekly charts 

 Year-end charts 

 Certifications 

 Release history 

 See also Big Ones You Can Look At''
List of best-selling albums in Argentina

References

External links 
 
 Big Ones at Yahoo! Music 

1994 greatest hits albums
Aerosmith compilation albums
Albums produced by Bruce Fairbairn
Albums produced by Michael Beinhorn
Geffen Records compilation albums